This is a list of urban areas in the United States as defined by the United States Census Bureau, ordered according to their 2020 census populations. An urban area is defined by the Census Bureau as a contiguous set of census blocks that are "densely developed residential, commercial, and other nonresidential areas". 

Urban areas consist of a densely-settled urban core, plus surrounding developed areas that meet certain density criteria. Since urban areas are composed of census blocks and not cities, counties, or county-equivalents, urban area boundaries may consist of partial areas of these political units. Urban areas are distinguished from rural areas: any area not part of an urban area is considered to be rural by the Census Bureau. The list in this article includes urban areas with a population of at least 50,000, but urban areas may have as few as 5,000 residents or 2,000 housing units.

For the 2020 census, the Census Bureau redefined the classification of urban areas. The criteria were finalized on March 24, 2022, after a period of public input, and the final results of delineation were published on December 29, 2022. Key changes for the 2020 criteria included:

 The removal of the distinction between urban areas and urban clusters. Urban areas were previously defined as areas with at least 50,000 residents, and urban clusters were areas with less than 50,000. Areas that would previously be called urban clusters are now all urban areas.
 The use of housing unit density as an alternative minimum for inclusion: either 2,000 housing units or a population of 5,000 may qualify an area as an urban area. Previously, this minimum was 2,500 in population.
 The lowering of the allowable "jump distance" from 2.5 to 1.5 miles. A jump is a distance along a road to connect two urban territories surrounded by rural territory.

Largely as a result of the change in criteria, the proportion of American citizens living in urban areas fell between 2010 and 2020, from 80.7% to 80.0%. There were 2,646 urban areas identified by the Census Bureau for 2020. 510 had a population of 50,000 or more and are listed here.

2020 urban areas

Images

See also

Outline of the United States
Index of United States-related articles
Geography
Human geography
Demography
United States
United States Census Bureau
Demographics of the United States
US states and territories by population
US cities by population
US cities and metropolitan areas
 Office of Management and Budget
 Statistical area (United States)
Combined statistical area (list)
Core-based statistical area (list)
Metropolitan statistical area (list, by GDP)
Micropolitan statistical area (list)
 United States urban area (list)

Notes

References 

Urban Areas
Urban Areas
Urban Areas
Urban areas
United States